The Doctor of Liberal Arts degree (D.L.A.) is a professional artistic doctorate in the field of the Liberal Arts, including architecture, dance, music, theater and visual arts. Like other doctorates, is an academic degree of the highest level. 

D.L.A. students of music typically complete applied studies culminating in several solo recitals, take courses within their area of specialization (as well as related courses in music theory and music history), and write a thesis or dissertation.

In the field of the visual arts it is the intention of the program to give young artists the chance to develop into creative individuals, through intensive studio practice, including study of the materials, tools, theory and methodology of the profession. The three-year doctoral program leads to the D.L.A. degree in the fields of painting, sculpture, graphics, graphic design, intermedia, and restoration. The works produced during these studies, and the final master works, are regularly exhibited.

Universities offering the degree 
There are several universities in Hungary that grant the degree as Doctor Liberalium Artium:
Budapest University of Technology and Economics
Franz Liszt Academy of Music in Budapest
Hungarian University of Fine Arts
Moholy-Nagy University of Art and Design 
University of Pécs
The degree is also offered as part of some programs of continuing studies:

Washington University in St. Louis
Dickinson College (honorary)

Florida Southern College gave Lynne V. Cheney an honorary Doctor of Liberal Arts in 1993.

See also
Doctor of Liberal Studies
Doctor of Letters
Doctor of Musical Arts

References

Liberalium Artium, Doctor
Vocational education